Vision with Values (ViVa) is a political party in Guatemala.

History
The party was established on 20 January 2007 by Harold Caballeros. It contested the 2011 general elections in alliance with Encuentro por Guatemala, nominating nominated Caballeros as its presidential candidate; Suger finished fifth in a field of ten candidates with 6% of the vote. In the Congressional elections the parties won six of the 158 seats.

After the alliance with Encuentro por Guatemala ended, the party contested the elections in 2015 alone with Zury Ríos, the daughter of general and military dictator Efraín Ríos Montt, as its presidential candidate. Together with vice-presidential candidate Juan Luis Mirón, she received 6% of the vote. In the congressional elections the party received 4% of the vote and won five seats. In April 2019 congressional candidate Julio Rosales, who stood for a seat in Retalhuleu, was dismissed from the party after an arrest warrant from the Texas District Court concerning the production and distribution of heroin, was executed in Guatemala City.

In 2019 the party nominated Isaac Farchi as its presidential candidate. His campaign focused on corruption and security issues in Guatemala, naming Israel as a positive role model for the latter. He received about 6% of the vote. In the legislative elections the party increased its vote share slightly to 4.7%, winning seven seats. After the elections the party supported the agenda of President Alejandro Giammattei and supported the election of Shirley Rivera for President of the Congress in October 2021.

Election results

President

Congress

Notes

References

External links
Official website

2007 establishments in Guatemala
Conservative liberal parties
Conservative parties in Guatemala
Political parties established in 2007
Protestantism in Guatemala
Protestant political parties